Corvi may refer to:

Astronomy
 Alpha Corvi
 Beta Corvi
 Delta Corvi
 Epsilon Corvi
 Eta Corvi
 Gamma Corvi
 Zeta Corvi

People
 Domenico Corvi (1721–1803), Italian painter
 Enzo Corvi (born 1992), Swiss professional ice hockey center

Surnames
 Corvi, surname of a noble and historic Italian family descended from the gens Valeria

Other
 I Corvi (Italian for "The Crows"), Italian beat group